WTNH (channel 8) is a television station licensed to New Haven, Connecticut, United States, serving the Hartford–New Haven market as an affiliate of ABC. It is owned by Nexstar Media Group alongside MyNetworkTV affiliate WCTX (channel 59), also licensed to New Haven. Both stations share studios on Elm Street in downtown New Haven; per a channel sharing agreement, the stations transmit using WTNH's spectrum from a tower in Hamden, Connecticut.

History

Local pioneer (1948–1970)
WTNH first went on the air on June 15, 1948, as WNHC-TV, originally broadcasting on channel 6. It is the oldest television station in Connecticut. The station was founded by the Elm City Broadcasting Corporation, owners of WNHC radio (1340 AM, now WYBC; and 99.1 FM, now WPLR). Elm City Broadcasting founded WNHC radio in December 1944 and was principally owned by Patrick J. Goode, U.S. postmaster for New Haven; Garo W. Ray, Chief Engineer; and Aldo DeDominicis, a radio salesperson.

WNHC-TV was originally an affiliate of the DuMont Television Network, and claims to have been the first full-time affiliate of that short-lived network. The station originally broadcast from WNHC radio's building on Chapel Street in downtown New Haven. However, with no studio facilities of its own, it could not produce local programming. For a time, WNHC-TV simply rebroadcast the signal of DuMont's New York City flagship, WABD (now Fox flagship WNYW). In October 1948, the station added CBS programming to its schedule, and additional secondary affiliations with NBC and ABC followed a year later. The station was the first in the country to use videotape for local programming and one of the first to broadcast in color.

When the Federal Communications Commission (FCC)'s Sixth Report and Order ended the four-year freeze on television construction permit awards in 1952, it also reorganized channel allocations to alleviate interference issues. As a result, WNHC-TV changed frequencies and moved to channel 8 in December 1953. The next year, the FCC collapsed New Haven and Hartford into a single market. WNHC-TV shared some CBS programming with New Britain's WKNB-TV (channel 30, now NBC owned-and-operated station WVIT) until 1955, since WKNB's signal was not strong enough to cover New Haven at the time.

In 1956, the WNHC stations were purchased by Philadelphia-based Triangle Publications. Also that same year, WNHC-TV lost its CBS affiliation when that network purchased WGTH-TV in Hartford (channel 18, later WHCT and now Univision affiliate WUVN). This left channel 8 as a sole ABC affiliate, although it shared ABC programming with WATR-TV (channel 20, now WCCT-TV) in nearby Waterbury until 1966. Under Triangle ownership the WNHC stations moved to a new studio facility, on College Street in downtown New Haven, around 1960.

Until the original WTIC-TV (channel 3, now WFSB) signed on from Hartford in September 1957, WNHC-TV was the only station on the VHF dial in Connecticut. Many viewers northeast of Hartford used outdoor antennas to get spotty reception of CBS and NBC programs from Boston, while those southwest of Hartford with outdoor TV antennas got great to excellent reception from their respective New York City flagship stations; indeed, much of southwestern Connecticut is part of the New York City market. By contrast, most of Connecticut got a clear picture and pitch-perfect sound from channel 8.

Later years (1970–present)
Triangle was forced out of broadcasting in 1970 after then-Pennsylvania Governor Milton J. Shapp complained the company had used its Pennsylvania stations in a smear campaign against him. The WNHC stations were among the first batch to be sold, going to Capital Cities Communications, along with its sister stations in Philadelphia (WFIL-TV, now WPVI-TV) and Fresno (KFRE-TV, now KFSN-TV) in a deal that would be finalized in 1971. However, Capital Cities could not keep the radio stations because of the FCC's then-restrictions on ownership, resulting in WNHC-AM-FM being spun off to separate third parties. WNHC-TV changed its call letters to the current WTNH-TV in April 1971, not long after Capital Cities officially took over (the station dropped the -TV suffix from its calls in 1985, but continued to call itself "WTNH-TV" on-air well into the 1990s). The station later relocated for a second time in May 1983, into its present studio facility on Elm Street.

On March 19, 1985, Capital Cities announced its intention to buy ABC in a deal that would stun the broadcast industry. As part of the deal, Capital Cities was required to sell WTNH due to a significant signal overlap with ABC's New York flagship station, WABC-TV. Like the other major stations in Connecticut, WTNH's city-grade signal reaches Fairfield County, which is part of the New York City market. It also provides at least grade B coverage to most of Long Island. At the time, the FCC normally did not allow common ownership of two stations with overlapping coverage areas, and would not even consider granting a waiver for a city-grade overlap (the FCC began allowing common ownership of two stations with overlapping coverage areas in 2000). As a result, WTNH was sold to Cook Inlet Television Partners, a subsidiary of Cook Inlet Region, Inc. (an Alaska Native Regional Corporation); the deal was eventually completed in January 1986. During the mid-1980s, the syndicated Sally Jessy Raphael talk show originated from the WTNH studios in New Haven, until the show moved to New York City later in the decade.

Cook Inlet sold WTNH to LIN Television in 1994. When a new UHF station in New Haven, WTVU (channel 59, now WCTX) signed on in April 1995 as a WB affiliate, WTNH began operating the station through a local marketing agreement (LMA); prior to WTVU's launch, WTNH held a temporary secondary WB affiliation, airing its programming (which at the time consisted solely of a Wednesday prime time lineup) Saturdays in late night. In 2001, LIN TV bought WCTX outright. On May 18, 2007, the company announced that it was exploring strategic alternatives that could have resulted in the sale of the company. On March 21, 2014, Media General announced that it would purchase LIN Media and its stations, including WTNH and WCTX, in a $1.6 billion merger. The merger was completed on December 19.

On September 8, 2015, Media General announced that it would acquire the Meredith Corporation for $2.4 billion, with the combined group to be renamed Meredith Media General if the sale had been finalized. Because Meredith already owned WFSB, and the two stations ranked among the four highest-rated stations in the Hartford–New Haven market in total day viewership, the companies would have been required to sell either WTNH or WFSB to comply with FCC ownership rules as well as recent changes to those rules regarding same-market television stations that restrict sharing agreements; WCTX would have been the only one of the three stations affected by the merger that could legally be acquired by Meredith Media General, as its total day viewership ranked below the top-four ratings threshold. However, on January 27, 2016, Nexstar Broadcasting Group announced that it had reached an agreement to acquire Media General (which was approved on January 17, 2017), resulting in the termination of Meredith's acquisition by Media General. This sale reunited WTNH with former Triangle station property WTAJ-TV, which Nexstar acquired in 2006.

On December 3, 2018, Nexstar announced it would acquire the assets of Chicago-based Tribune Media—which has owned Fox affiliate WTIC-TV (channel 61) since 1996 and CW affiliate WCCT-TV (channel 20) since 2001—for $6.4 billion in cash and debt. Nexstar was required to sell two of the stations (including one ranking in the top four in ratings) to a separate, unrelated company to comply with FCC ownership rules. On March 20, 2019, it was announced that Nexstar would keep the WTNH/WCTX duopoly and sell the WTIC/WCCT duopoly to McLean, Virginia-based Tegna Inc. as part of the company's sale of nineteen Nexstar- and Tribune-operated stations to Tegna and the E. W. Scripps Company in separate deals worth $1.32 billion; this would make the WTIC/WCCT duopoly the first television properties in Connecticut and southern New England for Tegna.

News operation

WTNH presently broadcasts 48 hours of locally produced newscasts each week (with six hours each weekday and 4½ hours each on Saturdays and Sundays) among both WTNH and WCTX. In addition to its main studios, WTNH operates a New London bureau and a Hartford bureau on Columbus Boulevard. Along with regional NOAA National Weather Service radar data, the station operates its own weather radar near its transmitter site in Hamden. Together, these two sources are called "SkyMax Doppler Network". This can be seen via live video with audio from the National Weather Service on WTNH's website.

For over a quarter century, the station used the Action News format made famous at former Philadelphia sister station WFIL-TV (which became WPVI-TV and is now an ABC O&O), using the same "Move Closer to Your World" music and graphics packages as WPVI. It rebranded as NewsChannel 8 in 1996.

For most of the last half-century, WTNH has been a distant runner-up in the overall Connecticut market to dominant WFSB. However, in recent times, it has had to fend off a spirited challenge from WVIT. Since the turn of the millennium, the two stations have regularly traded the runner-up spot. However, WTNH appears to have higher ratings in southern and coastal Connecticut. Historically, WTNH's ratings for news and local programming are far higher in Nielsen's "Metro B" area of New Haven County than "Metro A" containing Hartford County.

Since 2000, WTNH has been producing a nightly prime time newscast at 10:00 p.m. on WBNE/WCTX. It has competed right from the start with WTIC-TV's 10:00 p.m. broadcast, which established itself as a viewer favorite since it debuted in 1989. As of the February 2008 ratings period, WTIC's weeknight newscast is actually the most watched late news broadcast in the market, even gathering more viewership than the 11:00 p.m. newscasts on Connecticut's Big Three stations. In 2005, WCTX began simulcasting the second hour of WTNH's weekday morning show at 6:00 a.m. followed by a third hour from 7:00 a.m. – 8:00 a.m. that was seen exclusively on WCTX, except for simulcast Good Morning America cut-ins on WTNH. The simulcast of the 6:00 a.m. hour was eventually dropped. The 7:00 a.m. hour received competition on March 3, 2008, when WTIC launched its own weekday morning show.

Its weekday noon newscast was originally an hour long, but was reduced to 30 minutes on February 23, 2009, when a new lifestyle/entertainment magazine show known as Connecticut Style was added at 12:30 p.m. On January 12, 2015, CT Style was added at 9:00 a.m. and the noon newscast become an hour long. On April 26, 2010, WTNH re-branded from News Channel 8 to News 8. In addition, WTNH began broadcasting its newscasts in 16:9 widescreen enhanced definition, with WCTX's newscasts and Connecticut Style being included in the upgrade. On October 4, 2010, WTNH became the third station in the market to begin broadcasting its local newscasts in high definition. WCTX's newscasts also made the transition, while Connecticut Style made the transition in 2015.

On January 2, 2017, Good Morning Connecticut was expanded to start at 4:30 a.m. while the noon newscast was shortened to 30 minutes. Connecticut Style was also cut to a half hour.

On March 30, 2020, WTNH planned to launch an expansion of WCTX's prime time newscast to the three-hour entirety of prime time on weeknights and 90 minutes on weekends. This quickly shifted to launching on March 16 instead to provide continuing coverage of the local impact of the COVID-19 pandemic.

Technical information

Subchannels
The station's digital signal is multiplexed:

Analog-to-digital conversion
WTNH shut down its analog signal, over VHF channel 8, on June 12, 2009, as part of the federally mandated transition from analog to digital television. The station's digital signal remained on its pre-transition VHF channel 10, using PSIP to display WTNH's virtual channel as 8 on digital television receivers.

Cable and satellite availability
During the 1970s and 1980s, WTNH once had carriage in portions of northeastern New Jersey in Bergen County and much of Suffolk County on Long Island.

References

External links
 

TNH
ABC network affiliates
Rewind TV affiliates
Television channels and stations established in 1948
Nexstar Media Group
1948 establishments in Connecticut
Companies based in New Haven, Connecticut